Franklin County is a nongovernmental county located in the northwestern part of the U.S. state of Massachusetts. As of the 2020 census, the population was 71,029, which makes it the least-populous county on the Massachusetts mainland, and the third-least populous county in the state. Its traditional county seat and most populous city is Greenfield. Its largest town by area is New Salem. Franklin County comprises the Greenfield Town, MA Micropolitan Statistical Area, which is included in the Springfield-Greenfield Town, MA Combined Statistical Area.

History
Franklin County was created on June 24, 1811, from the northern third of Hampshire County. It was named for Benjamin Franklin. Franklin County's government was abolished by the state government in 1997, at the county's request.

Law and government
Like several other Massachusetts counties, Franklin County exists today only as a geographic region and has no county government. The Franklin County Commission voted itself out of existence, and all former state-mandated county functions were assumed by state agencies in 1997. The sheriff and some other regional officials with specific duties are still elected locally to perform duties within the county region. Counties in Massachusetts and New England generally are historically weak governmental structures.
The primary subdivision of the Commonwealth is the municipal town.  Communities are permitted to form regional compacts for sharing services. The municipalities of Franklin County have formed the Franklin Regional Council of Governments. The regional council provides various services on a regional basis, and a majority of the county's towns are members of the Franklin County Solid Waste Management District, which provides municipal waste disposal and recycling services to its members. Public transportation throughout the county and in the North Quabbin area of northwestern Worcester County is provided by the Franklin Regional Transit Authority.

Politics

|}

Geography and climate
 and (3.5%) is water. Central and southern Franklin County is dominated by the northern end of the Pioneer Valley, with steep hills rising on either side of the Connecticut River.

The high point of Franklin County is Crum Hill, 2,841 feet (866 m), located in the town of Monroe.

Climate
The climate in Franklin County is typically cool temperate. The area is also somewhat maritime, with relatively high year-round precipitation. Summers are warm and humid with frequent evening storms, and winters are cool to cold with frequent snow and subfreezing (below 31F) temperatures.

Protected areas
 Silvio O. Conte National Fish and Wildlife Refuge (part)
 Paul C. Jones Working Forest (privately owned with conservation easement) around Brushy Mountain, Shutesbury

Various Department of Conservation & Recreation properties.

Demographics

2000 census
At the 2000 census there were 71,535 people, 29,466 households, and 18,416 families in the county. There were 31,939 housing units at an average density of 46 per square mile (18/km2). The racial makeup of the county was 95.40% White, 0.89% Black or African American, 0.29% Native American, 1.04% Asian, 0.03% Pacific Islander, 0.75% from other races, and 1.61% from two or more races.  1.99%. were Hispanic or Latino of any race. 16.2% were of English, 12.2% Irish, 12.0% Polish, 10.2% French, 7.0% French Canadian, 6.7% German, 6.1% Italian and 6.0% American ancestry according to Census 2000. Most of those claiming to be of "American" ancestry are actually of English descent, but have family that has been in the country for so long, in many cases since the early seventeenth century that they choose to identify simply as "American". 94.5% spoke English and 1.8% Spanish as their first language.

Of the 29,466 households 29.5% had children under the age of 18 living with them, 47.9% were married couples living together, 10.6% had a female householder with no husband present, and 37.5% were non-families. 29.0% of households were one person and 10.9% were one person aged 65 or older.  The average household size was 2.38 and the average family size was 2.95.

The age distribution was 23.5% under the age of 18, 7.8% from 18 to 24, 28.5% from 25 to 44, 25.9% from 45 to 64, and 14.2% 65 or older.  The median age was 40 years. For every 100 females, there were 93.8 males.  For every 100 females age 18 and over, there were 90.5 males.

The median household income was $40,768 and the median family income was $50,915. Males had a median income of $36,350 versus $27,228 for females. The per capita income for the county was $20,672.  About 6.5% of families and 9.4% of the population were below the poverty line, including 10.5% of those under age 18 and 8.8% of those age 65 or over.

2010 census
At the 2010 census, there were 71,372 people, 30,462 households, and 18,317 families in the county. The racial makeup of the county was 94.2% white, 1.3% Asian, 1.1% black, 0.3% American Indian, 1.0% from other races, and 2.1% from two or more races. Those of Hispanic or Latino origin made up 3.2% of the population. The largest ancestry groups were:

20.0% English
19.8% Irish
15.9% French
12.6% Polish
12.0% German
9.1% Italian
7.2% French Canadian
4.5% Scottish
3.9% American
2.1% Swedish
2.0% Scotch-Irish
1.8% Puerto Rican
1.5% Russian
1.3% Dutch
1.3% Portuguese
1.3% Lithuanian
1.0% Welsh

Of the 30,462 households, 26.4% had children under the age of 18 living with them, 44.8% were married couples living together, 10.7% had a female householder with no husband present, 39.9% were non-families, and 30.5% of households were made up of individuals. The average household size was 2.29 and the average family size was 2.85. The median age was 44.2 years.

The median household income was $52,002 and the median family income was $65,760. Males had a median income of $45,480 versus $37,309 for females. The per capita income for the county was $27,544. About 7.7% of families and 11.3% of the population were below the poverty line, including 14.8% of those under age 18 and 7.5% of those age 65 or over.

Demographic breakdown by town

Income

The ranking of unincorporated communities that are included on the list are reflective if the census designated locations and villages were included as cities or towns. Data is from the 2007-2011 American Community Survey 5-Year Estimates.

Transportation
Franklin County is served by buses run by the Franklin Regional Transit Authority. Southeastern Franklin County is also served by the Pioneer Valley Transit Authority, with transportation to destinations in neighboring Hampshire County.

Major highways

Notable residents
 David Dunnels White, Medal of Honor nominee for capturing Major General Custis Lee, son of Robert E. Lee, at the Battle of Sailors Creek, Virginia, April 6, 1865. He was born in Cheshire, Massachusetts, in 1844, and is buried in the Bozrah Cemetery in East Hawley, Massachusetts, in 1924.

Communities

City
Greenfield (traditional county seat)

Towns

Ashfield
Bernardston
Buckland
Charlemont
Colrain
Conway
Deerfield
Erving
Gill
Hawley
Heath
Leverett
Leyden
Monroe
Montague
New Salem
Northfield
Orange
Rowe
Shelburne
Shutesbury
Sunderland
Warwick
Wendell
Whately

Census-designated places

Deerfield
Millers Falls
Northfield
Orange
Shelburne Falls
South Deerfield
Turners Falls

Other unincorporated communities
Lake Pleasant
Satans Kingdom
Zoar

See also
 List of Massachusetts locations by per capita income
 Registry of Deeds (Massachusetts)
 National Register of Historic Places listings in Franklin County, Massachusetts

References

External links

 National Register of Historic Places listing for Franklin Co., Massachusetts
 Map of cities and towns of Massachusetts 
 Franklin Regional Council of Governments website
 Franklin County Solid Waste Management District website 
 Franklin Regional Transit Authority website
 Franklin County Chamber of Commerce website
 Wall & Gray. 1871. Atlas of Massachusetts. Map of Massachusetts. USA. New England. Counties – Berkshire, Franklin, Hampshire and Hampden, Worcester, Middlesex, Essex and Norfolk, Boston - Suffolk, Plymouth, Bristol, Barnstable and Dukes (Cape Cod). Cities – Springfield, Worcester, Lowell, Lawrence, Haverhill, Newburyport, Salem, Lynn, Taunton, Fall River. New Bedford. These 1871 maps of the counties and cities are useful to see the roads and rail lines.
 Beers, D.G. 1872. Atlas of Essex County Map of Massachusetts Plate 5.  Click on the map for a very large image.

 
Massachusetts counties
Springfield metropolitan area, Massachusetts
1811 establishments in Massachusetts
Populated places established in 1811
1997 disestablishments in Massachusetts
Populated places disestablished in 1997